Sixth Sense is an Indian Telugu-language reality game show created and hosted by Ohmkar. The show started airing on 31 March 2018 on Star Maa. It is produced by OAK Entertainments house. The four seasons of the show aired on every Saturday and Sunday at 9 pm onwards.

As of 2021, a total of four seasons with 106 episodes were aired. It has been in sync with the schedule of Bigg Boss for a few seasons.

Format
The show format is considered to be a first of its kind show involving the unique senses of humans and explore their thinking abilities with minutely orchestrated nuances between the host and participating celebrities. Sight, taste, hearing, smell and touch are the typically recognized human senses. The game demands the contestants to make a guess based on their instinct and they will be rewarded if their decision is right. His catch-phrase "One Second" from Sixth Sense is also quite popular. It is one of the most successful shows in his television career.

Production 
In an interview to The Times of India, Ohmkar said " just couldn’t find time for it, so it did not materialise. Initially, we thought of going ahead with a tried and tested format but after the success of Raju Gari Gadhi and its sequel, I knew the audience will expect something different. So, I decided to do something yet simple. That’s how I hit upon the concept of Sixth Sense. I would also like to mention the DoP, R. Diwakaran, a key factor behind the show."

Series overview

Season 1 

The show was announced in March 2018 by Ohmkar and Star Maa.

Format

Sixth Sense Challenge 
Round–1 : Top-scorer of the first round will play the challenge. Three bikes are placed and the participant will be given a single key, by which he/she need to guess the suitable bike. If they matches the key and bike correctly, then they can take away the bike.
Round–2 : Three large golden eggs are hanged, out of which, two eggs are empty and the remaining contains one-and-half lakh rupees worth Gold. The top-scorer of the second round will be given two chances, in which he/she need to break only the empty eggs. If he/she breaks the golden egg that contains gold, then they will lose the challenge.
Round–3 : Six lockers, each containing ₹10, ₹100, ₹1000, ₹10,000, ₹1,00,000 and 10,00,000 are placed. The top-scorer need to open five of the six lockers. Amount contained in the remained (sixth) locker will be awarded to them.

Participants

Season 2 

The second season is all set for a premiere from 8 December 2018 onwards.

Format

Sixth Sense Challenge 
Round–1 : Top-scorer of the first round will play the challenge. Three bikes are placed and the participant will be given a single key, by which he/she need to guess the suitable bike. If they matches the key and bike correctly, then they can take away the bike.
Round–2 : Three large golden eggs are hanged, out of which, two eggs are empty and the remaining contains one-and-half lakh rupees worth Gold. The top-scorer of the second round will be given two chances, in which he/she need to break only the empty eggs. If he/she breaks the golden egg that contains gold, then they will lose the challenge.
Round–3 : Six lockers, each containing ₹10, ₹100, ₹1000, ₹10,000, ₹1,00,000 and 10,00,000 are placed. The top-scorer need to open five of the six lockers. Amount contained in the remained (sixth) locker will be awarded to them.

Participants

Season 3 

The TV host turned film maker Ohmkar is back to the small screen with the third season of popular game show Sixth Sense is all set for a premiere on 9 November 2019 onwards.

Format

Sixth Sense Challenge 
Round–1 : Two bikes are placed. The top-scorer can get any one of the bikes he wish. To win the bike, he/she need to play a game "Shoot Out". (Shoot Out game : Three cases, each containing two dummy guns (silver and black) are placed. In each case, one dummy gun is loaded and the other one is unloaded/empty. Participant need to shoot out a loaded dummy gun, by choosing any one of the two dummy guns in the three cases. Each shoot out has a value of one point. Participant need to score a minimum of two points.)
Round–2 : Three large golden eggs are hanged, out of which, two eggs are empty and the remaining contains one-and-half lakh rupees worth Gold. The top-scorer of the second round will be given two chances, in which he/she need to break only the empty eggs. If he/she breaks the golden egg that contains gold, then they will lose the challenge.
Round–3 : Six lockers, each containing ₹10, ₹100, ₹1000, ₹10,000, ₹1,00,000 and 10,00,000 are placed. The top-scorer need to open five of the six lockers. Amount contained in the remained (sixth) locker will be awarded to them.

Participants

Season 4 

Ohmkar-hosted Sixth Sense fourth season is set to return to the small screen on 12 June 2021 onwards.

Format

Sixth Sense Challenge 
Round–1 : In the first round, the top-scorer need to play any one of the challenges, i.e. "Gun Shot" or "Guess the Switch".Gun Shot : Two bikes are placed. The top-scorer can get any one of the bikes he wish. To win the bike, he/she need to play a game "Shoot Out". (Shoot Out game : Three cases, each containing two dummy guns (silver and black) are placed. In each case, one dummy gun is loaded and the other one is unloaded/empty. Participant need to shoot out a loaded dummy gun, by choosing any one of the two dummy guns in the three cases. Each shoot out has a value of one point. Participant need to score a minimum of two points.)Guess the Switch : Five products/appliances are placed. Five switch boards (each with two switches and a bulb connected to the pair of switches) which are connected to the products are also placed near the products/appliances. The top-scorer of the first round need to light up the bulb connected to the respective product by pressing the correct switch (of the two switches connected to the bulb). Top-scorer need to switch on as many as bulbs, such that they can win as many as products/appliances.
Round–2 : Three large golden eggs are hanged, out of which, two eggs are empty and the remaining contains one lakh rupees worth Gold. The top-scorer of the second round will be given two chances, in which he/she need to break only the empty eggs. If he/she breaks the golden egg that contains gold, then they will lose the challenge.
Round–3 : Six lockers, each containing ₹10, ₹100, ₹1000, ₹10,000, ₹1,00,000 and 10,00,000 are placed. The top-scorer need to open five of the six lockers. Amount contained in the remained (sixth) locker will be awarded to them.

Participants

Adaptations

References

Telugu-language television shows
2018 Indian television series debuts
2018 Indian television seasons
2019 Indian television seasons
2020 Indian television seasons
2021 Indian television seasons
Indian reality television series
Indian game shows
Star Maa original programming